Rave Magazine may refer to:
 Rave (magazine), an Indian music magazine
 Rave Magazine (Australia), an Australian music and entertainment magazine